This is a list of years in Hong Kong television.

Twenty-first century

Twentieth century

See also 
 List of years in television

Television
Television in Hong Kong by year
Hong Kong television